María Emma de las Mercedes Adam de Aróstegui (24 September 1873 – 20 October 1957) was a Cuban pianist and composer who lived and worked in Spain. She was born in Camagüey, Cuba, and moved to Spain with her family when she was nine years old. She studied with Joaquin Zuazagoitia in Santiago de Compostela and continued her studies in the Conservatorio Real in Madrid. She studied with Louis Diemer and Jules Massenet in Paris and with Vincent d'Indy.

After completing her education, she worked as a composer and pianist, giving concerts with Pablo Casals. Her music was performed in Paris and in Cuba. She died in Madrid.

Works
Selected works include:
Serenata Española
La Peregrinacion de Childe Harold
Poemo sinfonico
En el Campo de Waterloo
La vida de sueño, opera
La infancia
Danzas Cubanas
Seranata andaluza
Ballade guerriere ecossaise (text: Sir Walter Scott)
A une femme for voice and cello

She also published an essay La etica y la estitica en la obra musical.

References

1873 births
1917 deaths
19th-century classical composers
20th-century classical composers
Cuban music educators
Women classical composers
Cuban classical pianists
Women classical pianists
Cuban women pianists
Cuban classical composers
People from Camagüey
Women music educators
20th-century women composers
19th-century women composers
19th-century women pianists
20th-century women pianists
Migrants from Spanish Cuba to Spain